In aviation, a terminal control area (TMA, or TCA in the U.S. and Canada), is a designated area of controlled airspace surrounding a major airport where there is a high volume of traffic. TMA airspace is normally designed in a circular configuration centered on the airport, and differs from a control area in that it includes several levels of increasingly larger areas, creating an "upside-down wedding cake" shape.

In Canada, the inner circle of the TCA is generally a 12 NM radius from the airport geographic center based at 1200 feet AGL, with an intermediate circle at 35 NM based at 2200 feet AGL, and an outer limit at 45 NM radius based at 9500 feet AGL. In Canada, the TCA is normally designated as class B, C or D.

In the U.S., the airspace of a TCA is typically designated as class B.

In the U.K., the airspace of a TMA is usually designated as class A, D or E.

In Australia, "terminal airspace" is not used both in common vernacular or publication and legislation. However, the traditional structure of terminal airspace is present in Class C and D aerodromes.

See also
Airway (aviation)
Control zone
Flight information region

References

Air traffic control